This is a list of common microcontrollers listed by brand.

Altera

In 2015, Altera was acquired by Intel.

 Nios II 32-bit configurable soft microprocessor
 Nios 16-bit configurable soft processor

Analog Devices
 Blackfin
 Super Harvard Architecture Single-Chip Computer (SHARC)
 TigerSHARC
 ADSP-21xx digital signal processor
 MicroConverter Family – ARM7 and 8051 cores

ARM 

While Arm is a fabless semiconductor company (it does not manufacture or sell its own chips), it licenses the ARM architecture family design to a variety of companies.
Those companies in turn sell billions of ARM-based chips per year—12 billion ARM-based chips shipped in 2014,
about
24 billion ARM-based chips shipped in 2020,
some of those are popular chips in their own right.

Atmel

In 2016, Atmel was sold to Microchip Technology.
 AT89 series (Intel 8051 architecture)
 AT90, ATtiny, ATmega, ATxmega series (AVR architecture) (Atmel Norway design)
 AT91SAM (ARM architecture)
 AVR32 (32-bit AVR architecture) (Atmel Norway design)
 MARC4

Cypress Semiconductor

In 2020, Cypress Semiconductor was acquired by Infineon Technologies.
 CY8C2xxxx (PSoC1), M8C 
 CY8C3xxxx (PSoC3), 8051
 CY8C4xxxx (PSoC4), ARM Cortex-M0
 CY8C5xxxx (PSoC5), ARM Cortex-M3
 PSoC (Programmable System on Chip)

ELAN Microelectronics Corp.
ELAN Microelectronics Corporation is an IC designer and provider of 8-bit microcontrollers and PC Peripheral ICs. Headquartered in Hsinchu Science Park, the Silicon Valley of Taiwan, ELAN's microcontroller product range includes the following:

 EM78PXXX Low Pin-Count MCU Family
 EM78PXXX GPIO Type MCU Family
 EM78PXXXN ADC Type MCU Family

These are clones of the 12- and 14-bit Microchip PIC line of processors, but with a 13-bit instruction word.

EPSON Semiconductor
 4-bit
S1C6x family
 8-bit
 S1C88 family
 16-bit
 S1C17 family
 32-bit
 S1C33 family

Espressif Systems
Espressif Systems, a company with headquarters in Shanghai, China made their debut in the microcontroller scene with their range of inexpensive and feature-packed WiFi microcontrollers such as ESP8266.

 32-bit
 ESP8266
 ESP32 Xtensa variants
 ESP32, ESP32-S2, ESP32-S3 SoCs
 ESP32 RISC-V variants
 ESP32C2, ESP32C3, ESP32C6, ESP32H4 SoCs

Freescale Semiconductor

Until 2004, these µCs were developed and marketed by Motorola, whose semiconductor division was spun off to establish Freescale. In 2015, Freescale was acquired by NXP.

 8-bit
 Freescale S08
 68HC05 (CPU05)
 68HC08 (CPU08)
 68HC11 (CPU11)
 16-bit
 Freescale S12
 68HC12 (CPU12)
 68HC16 (CPU16)
 Freescale DSP56800 (DSPcontroller)
 32-bit
 Freescale Kinetis (ARM architecture)
 Freescale 683XX
 MCF5xxx (Freescale Coldfire)
 M·CORE
 MPC500
 MPC 860 (PowerQUICC)
 MPC 8240/8250 (PowerQUICC II)
 MPC 8540/8555/8560 (PowerQUICC III)
 MPC 5554/5566
 MPC 5777

Fujitsu

Holtek
Holtek Semiconductor is a major Taiwan-based designer of 32-bit microcontrollers, 8-bit microcontrollers and peripheral products. Microcontroller products are centred around an ARM core in the case of 32-bit products and 8051 based core and Holtek's own core in the case of 8-bit products. Located in the Hsinchu Science Park, the company's product range includes the following microcontroller device series:

 HT32FXX 32-bit ARM core microcontroller series
 HT85FXX 8051 Core based microcontroller series
 HT48FXX Flash I/O type series
 HT48RXX I/O type series
 HT46RXX A/D type series
 HT49RXX LCD type series
 HT82XX Computer Peripheral series
 HT95XX Telecom Peripheral series
 HT68FXX I/O Type Flash series
 HT66FXX A/D Type Flash series
 HT32XX 32-bit ARM core series

Hyperstone
 32-bit Hyperstone RISC-microprocessor

Infineon
Infineon offers microcontrollers for the automotive, industrial and multimarket industry. DAVE3, a component based auto code generation free tool, provides faster development of complex embedded projects.

 8-bit
 XC800 family Based on the 8051 architecture the XC800 is divided into the A-(Automotive) and I-(Industrial) Family, providing low cost micros, for example applied in applications like body, safety, motor control, intelligent lighting and electro mobility
 16-bit 
 XE166 family, a Real Time Signal Controller applied in industrial applications 
 XC 2000 family, designed for Automotive applications
 C166 family
 C167 family
 32-bit
Infineon XMC4000  is an ARM Cortex M4F based microcontroller family for industrial applications.
 TriCore™ family is based on a unified RISC/MCU/DSP processor core. Infineon launched the first generation of AUDO (Automotive unified processor) in 1999. The TC1782 is the first member of the AUDO MAX family designed for automotive applications
 Infineon XMC1000  is a 32-bit Industrial Microcontroller ARM® Cortex™-M0, 32 MHz.
 Infineon Embedded Power Relay Driver IC (TLE984x) - ARM® Cortex™-M0 based family for automotive applications
 Infineon Embedded Power 2-Phase Bridge Driver IC (TLE986x) - ARM® Cortex™-M3 based family for Brushed DC Motors
 Infineon Embedded Power 3-Phase Bridge Driver IC (TLE987x) - ARM® Cortex™-M3 based family for Brushless DC Motors

Intel

 8-bit
 MCS-48 8048 family – also incl. 8035, 8038, 8039, 8040, 8X42, 8X49, 8050; X=0 or 7
 MCS-51 8051 family – also incl. 8X31, 8X32, 8X52; X=0, 3, 7 or 9
 MCS-151 High-performance 8051 instruction set/binary compatible family
 8/16-bit/32-bit
 MCS-251 32-bit ALU with 1/8/16/32-bit CISC instruction set and 24-bit external address space (16-bit wide segmented). Fully binary compatible to the 8051 8-bit family.
 16-bit
 MCS-96 (8096 family – also incl. 8061)
 Intel MCS-296

{|class="wikitable"
|-
! X !! On-chip code memory 
|-
|0
|No on-chip memory
|-
|3
|OTP
|-
|7
|EEPROM
|-
|9
|Flash
|}

Lattice Semiconductor
 Mico8 8-bit soft microprocessor
 Mico32 32-bit soft microprocessor

Maxim Integrated
In 2021, Maxim Integrated was acquired by Analog Devices.
 8051 Family
 MAXQ RISC Family
 Secure Micros Family
 ARM 922T
 MIPS 4kSD

Microchip Technology

Since 2013, Microchip has shipped over 1 billion PIC microcontrollers per year, growing every year.

Microchip produces microcontrollers with three very different architectures:

8-bit (8-bit data bus) PICmicro, with a single accumulator (8 bits):

 PIC10 and PIC12: 12-bit instruction words
 PIC16 series: 14-bit instruction words, one address pointer ("indirect register pair")
 PIC16F628 (Replacement for very popular but discontinued PIC16F84) – PIC16F84A is still in production as of April 8, 2022.
 PIC18 series: 16-bit instruction words, three address pointers ("indirect register pairs")
16-bit (16-bit data bus) microcontrollers, with 16 general-purpose registers (each 16-bit)
 PIC24: 24-bit instruction words
 dsPIC: based on PIC24, plus DSP functions, such as a single-cycle MAC (multiply–accumulate) into two 40-bit accumulators.

32-bit (32-bit data bus) microcontrollers:

 PIC32MM Series:  16/32-bit instructions, uses the MIPS32 microAptiv UC Core MIPS architecture
 PIC32MX series: 32-bit instructions, uses the MIPS32 M4K Core MIPS architecture
 PIC32MZ series: 32-bit instructions, uses the MIPS32 M-Class Core MIPS architecture

National Semiconductor

 4-bit
 COP400
 8-bit
 COP8
 16-bit
 CR16

NEC
 4-bit
 17K
 75X
 75XL
 8-bit
 87XL
 87AD
 78K Family (8/16-bit)
 8-bit: 78K/1, 78K/2, 78K/0, 78K0S
 16-bit: 78K/3, 78K/6, 78K/4, 78K0R
 32-bit
 V60V80
 V810/V830
 V850

Nordic Semiconductor
Nordic Semiconductor is a company with headquarters in Trondheim, Norway offering low power Bluetooth Low Energy SoCs as well as cellular network connectivity solutions for IoT devices.
 32-bit BLE SoCs
 NRF51, NRF52, NRF53 Series
 32-bit Cellular IoT SIP
 NRF91 Series

NXP Semiconductors

 8-bit
 LPC700, LPC900 series are 80C51-based
 16-bit
 XA
 32-bit
 ARM7
 LPC2100, LPC2200, LPC2300, LPC2400 series
 ARM9
 LPC2900, LPC3100, LPC3200 series
 ARM Cortex-M0
 LPC1100, LPC1200 series
 ARM Cortex-M0+
 LPC800 series
 ARM Cortex-M3
 LPC1300, LPC1700, LPC1800 series
 ARM Cortex-M4
 LPC4000, LPC4300 series
 ARM Cortex-M7
 RT1050, RT1050 series

Nuvoton Technology
 8-bit
 8051 MCUs
 32-bit
 ARM Cortex-M0 MCUs
 ARM Cortex-M4 MCUs

Panasonic

 List of Panasonic Microcontrollers / microcomputers
 4-bit
 MN1400
 MN1500
 MN1700
 8-bit
 MN1870
 MN1880
 AM1 (MN101)
 16-bit
 AM2 (MN102)
 32-bit
 AM3, AM32 (MN1030, MN103, MN103E, MN103L, MN103S, MN103H)

Parallax
 Basic Stamp
 SX
 These were formerly made by Ubicom, former Scenix Semiconductor. The SX die has been discontinued by Ubicom. Parallax has accumulated a large stock of the dies and is managing the packaging.
 SX-18, 20, 28, 48 and 52 versions (Note that the SX-18 and SX-52 have been discontinued)
 Propeller
 The Propeller is a 8-core 32-bit microcontroller with 32 KB internal RAM.

Rabbit Semiconductor
 Rabbit 2000
 Rabbit 3000
 Rabbit 4000
 Rabbit 5000
 Rabbit 6000

Raspberry Pi Foundation 

 32-bit ARM Cortex-M0+
 RP2040

Renesas Electronics
Renesas is a joint venture comprising the semiconductor businesses of Hitachi, Mitsubishi Electric and NEC Electronics, creating the largest microcontroller manufacturer in the world.

 4-bit microcontrollers
 720
 8-bit microcontrollers
 78K0
 78K0S
 740
 16-bit microcontrollers
 RL78
 78K0R
 R8C
 M16C
 H8S
 H8
 H8/Super Low Power
 32-bit microcontrollers
 RH850
 RX
 SuperH
 V850
 R32C
 M32C
 M32R
 H8SX

Redpine Signals 
 RS14100
 RS13100

Rockwell
Rockwell semiconductors (now called Conexant) created a line of 6502 based microcontrollers that were used with their telecom (modem) chips. Most of their microcontrollers were packaged in a QIP package.

 R6501
 R6511
 R8070

Silicon Laboratories
Manufactures a line of 8-bit 8051-compatible microcontrollers, notable for high speeds (50–100 MIPS) and large memories in relatively small package sizes.  A free IDE is available that supports the USB-connected ToolStick line of modular prototyping boards.  These microcontrollers were originally developed by Cygnal. In 2012, the company introduced ARM-based mixed-signal MCUs with very low power and USB options, supported by free Eclipse-based tools. The company acquired Energy Micro in 2013 and now offers a number of ARM-based 32-bit microcontrollers.

 8-bit
 C8051
 32-bit
 ARM Cortex-M0+
 EFM32 Zero
 ARM Cortex-M3
 EFM32 Tiny, Gecko, Leopard, Giant
 ARM Cortex-M4
 EFM32 Wonder

Silicon Motion 
 SM2XX – Flash memory card controllers
 SM321 – USB 2.0
 SM323 – USB 2.0
 SM323E – USB 2.0
 Silicon Motion's SM321E and SM324 controllers support SLC and MLC NAND flash from Samsung, Hynix, Toshiba and ST Micro as well as flash products from Renesas, Infineon and Micron. The SM321E is available in a 48-pin LQFP package and a 44-pin LGA package. The SM321E supports up to 4 SLC or MLC NAND flash chips with 4 bytes / 528 bytes ECC
 SM324 – USB 2.0
 Supports dual-channel data transfer at read speeds of 233× (35 MB/s) and write speeds of 160× (24 MB/s), making it the fastest USB 2.0 flash disk controller in the market. The SM324 also has serial peripheral interface (SPI) which allows for not only Master and Slave modes, but the flexibility to develop more functionality into USB flash disk (UFD) products such as GPS, fingerprint sensor, Bluetooth and memory-capacity display. The SM324 is available in a 64-pin LQFP package. The SM324 supports 8 SLC or MLC NAND flash chips with 4 bytes / 528 bytes ECC.
 SM325 – USB 2.0
 SM330 – USB 2.0
 SM501, SM502 – Mobile Graphics
 SM712 – Mobile Graphics
 SM722 – Mobile Graphics
 SM340 – MP3/JPEG
 SM350 – MP3/JPEG
 SM370 – Image processing

Sony
 SPC700 series
 SPC900 series
 SPC970 series
 SR110 series

Spansion
Microcontrollers acquired from Fujitsu:

 F²MC Family (8/16-bit)
 FR Family (32-bit RISC)
 FR-V Family (32-bit RISC VLIW/vector processor)
 FM3 (Cortex M3)
 FM4 (Cortex M4)
 FCR4 (Cortex R4 with 90 nm Spansion Flash)

STMicroelectronics

 8-bit
 ST6
 ST7
 STM8 (STM8 Website), (STM8 Information). 
 μPSD (8032)
 16-bit
 ST10
 32-bit
 PowerPC
 SPC5 32-bit Automotive microcontrollers integrating ST’s proprietary embedded Flash technology.
 ST20
 ARM7
 STR7 (ARM7TDMI)
 ARM9
 STR9 (ARM966E-S)
 ARM Cortex-M (STM32 Family (STM32 Website))
 ARM Cortex-M0
 STM32  F0
 ARM Cortex-M0+
 STM32 C0, G0, L0
 ARM Cortex-M3
 STM32 F1, F2, L1, W
 ARM Cortex-M4
 STM32 F3, F4, G4, L4
 ARM Cortex-M7
 STM32 F7, H7
 ARM Cortex-M33
 STM32 L5, U5

Synopsys 

While Synopsys does not manufacture or sell chips directly, Synopsys licenses the ARC Processor design to a variety of companies that, as of 2020, ship about 1.5 billion products based on ARC processors per year.

Texas Instruments
 4-bit
 TMS1000
 8-bit
 TMS370
 16-bit
 MSP430
 32-bit
 MSP432
 TMS320 (DSP)
 C2000
 Stellaris (ARM Cortex-M3)
 Tiva™ C Series
 Hercules – TMS570 (ARM Cortex-R4), TMS470M ARM Cortex-M3, RM4 ARM Cortex-R4

The Stellaris and Tiva families, in particular, provide a high level of community-based, open source support through the TI e2e forums.

Toshiba
 TLCS-47 (4-bit)
 TLCS-870 (8-bit CISC)
 TLCS-900 (16 and 32-bit CISC)
 TX19A (32-bit RISC)

Ubicom
 IP2022
 Ubicom's IP2022 is a high performance (120 MIPS) 8-bit microcontroller. Features include: 64k flash code memory, 16 KB PRAM (fast code and packet buffering), 4 KB data memory, 8-channel A/D, various timers, and on-chip support for Ethernet, USB, UART, SPI and GPSI interfaces.
 IP3022
 IP3022 is Ubicom's latest high performance 32bit processor running at 250 MHz featuring eight hardware threads (barrel processor). It is specifically targeted at Wireless Routers.

WCH 
Manufactures a line of full-stack MCUs.

 Arm based chips
 CH32F103
 CH32F203
 CH32F205
 CH32F207
 CH32F208
 CH56X
 CH57X
 RISC-V based chips
 CH32V103
 CH32V203
 CH32V208
 CH32V303
 CH32V305
 CH32V307

Western Design Center

The Western Design Center licenses the 65C02 and 65816 designs to a variety of companies.
Those companies produce the 6502 (typically as part of a larger chip) in quantities over a hundred million units per year.

Xemics
 XE8000 8-bit microcontroller family

Xilinx
 Microblaze 32-bit soft microprocessor
 Picoblaze 8-bit soft microprocessor

XMOS
 XCore XS1 32-bit, Multicore Microcontrollers

ZiLOG
Zilog's (primary) microcontroller families, in chronological order:

 Older:
 Zilog Z8 – 8-bit Harvard architecture ROM / EPROM / OTP microcontroller with on-chip SRAM.
 Zilog Z180 – Z80 based microcontroller; on-chip peripherals; external memory; 1 MB address space.
 Newer:
 Zilog eZ8 – Better pipelined Z8 (2–3 times as clock cycle efficient as original Z8) with on-chip flash memory and SRAM.
 Zilog eZ80 – Fast 8/16/24-bit Z80 (3–4 times as cycle efficient as original Z80) with flash, SRAM, peripherals; linear addressing of 16 MB.
 Zilog Z16 – Fast 8/16/32-bit CPU with compact object code; 16 MB (4 GB possible) addressing range; flash, SRAM, peripherals, on chip.

Sortable table

References

.Common microcontrollers
.microcontrollers, common
microcontrollers